The 1867 Birthday Honours were appointments by Queen Victoria to various orders and honours to reward and highlight good works by citizens of the British Empire. The appointments were made to celebrate the official birthday of the Queen, and were published in The London Gazette on 24 May 1867.

The recipients of honours are displayed here as they were styled before their new honour, and arranged by honour, with classes (Knight, Knight Grand Cross, etc.) and then divisions (Military, Civil, etc.) as appropriate.

United Kingdom and British Empire

The Most Exalted Order of the Star of India

Knight Grand Commander (GCSI)
His Highness Krishnah Raj Wadyar, Maharajah of Mysore

Knight Commander (KCSI)
His Highness the Maharajah Sree Jowan Singjee, Chief of Edur
Daniel Eliott, Madras Civil Service (Retired), late Member of the Law Commission, of the Legislative Council of India, and of the Council of the Governor of Madras
George Frederick Harvey, Bengal Civil Service (Retired), late Commissioner of Agra
Major-General William Hill, late Madras Army, Commanding the Nizam's Contingent during the mutinies of 1857-1858
Major-General Vincent Eyre  Royal (late Bengal) Artillery
The Rajah Jodhbir Chund of Nadown
Henry Lacon Anderson, Bombay Civil Service (Retired), late Chief Secretary to the Government of Bombay, and Member of the Council of the Governor-General of India for making Laws and Regulations
Richard Temple  Bengal Civil Service, Resident at Hyderabad
Colonel Arthur Purves Phayre  Bengal Staff Corps, Chief Commissioner in British Burmah

References

Birthday Honours
1867 awards
1867 in India
1867 in the United Kingdom